Vedantam (Telugu: వేదాంతం) is one of the Indian surnames.
 Vedantam Raghavayya, Telugu film actor, choreographer director and producer. 
 Vedantam Sathya Narayana Sarma, Kuchipudi dance teacher.
 Vedantam Subramanyam,  drama artist.
 Shankar Vedantam, American journalist and science correspondent

Indian surnames